St Bartholomew's Cathedral, Messumba is an Anglican church in  the Diocese of Niassa, Mozambique. It has a partnership with St Peter's Church, Hammersmith.

References 

Anglican cathedrals in Africa
Cathedrals in Mozambique